The Guan-speaking Gikyode. Akyode people live in the northern Volta basin in the Oti Region of Ghana, Africa. They are considered as the indigenous people of the Nkwanta South District. These people migrated into the Volta valley from the Mossi region of Burkina Faso around 1000 AD. The Akyode language is called Gikyode.

The Akyodes are made up of communities, Shiare, Abrewanko, Odomi, Nyambong, Kyilinga, Lebon, Siban, Pawa, Sabon (Kabre Akura), Bonakye, Krachi Akura, Kpabo Akura, Gekorong, Okata (Katai Junction), Kanba (Abrewanko Junction), Nyakoma, Agou, New Agou, Asuogya, Keri, Kabiti, Akonsigewi (Dogokitiwa), Kromase, Anebogewi (Nyambong Junction) and Kue. The paramount seat is in Shiare. Kingship is called , and is the form of leadership in these communities. The chief of Kromase is called .

References

 
Ethnic groups in Ghana